Hans von Funck (23 December 1891 – 14 February 1979) was a German general in the Wehrmacht during World War II, who commanded the 7th Panzer Division and the XXXXVII Panzer Corps.

Career
Hans von Funck joined the German army in August 1914 and during World War I he was awarded the Iron Cross, 1st and 2nd Class. Funck was retained in the Reichswehr after the war. In July 1933 he was appointed to the General Staff. In 1936 he served in the Spanish Civil War as a leader of the German National Army in Spain. In 1940 he was appointed as the commander of the 3rd Panzer Brigade.
 
In 1941 Funck was given command  of the 7th Panzer Division as the successor to Erwin Rommel. Originally he was to have commanded the Afrika Corps, but Hitler loathed von Funck, as he had been a personal staff officer of Werner von Fritsch until von Fritsch was dismissed in 1938. He held this command on the central and southern sections of the Eastern Front. On 15 July 1941 he received the Knight's Cross of the Iron Cross.

On 1 February 1944 Funck was promoted to General der Panzertruppe and appointed as the commanding general of the XXXXVII Panzer Corps, initially on the eastern and later the western fronts. During the Battle for Normandy he (who was thoroughly disliked) accused Gerhard von Schwerin of passive resistance, cowardice and incompetence over the Vire counterattack on 28 July. Less than four hours before the start of Operation Luttich, Gunther von Kluge received an order from Hitler that Heinrich Eberbach rather than Funck was to lead it, although Kluge managed to persuade OKW to postpone the transfer of command.

On 4 September 1944 he was moved into the reserve of the OKH. Funck was interned as a war criminal in the Soviet Union from August 1945 until his release in 1955.

Awards
 Iron Cross (1914) 2nd Class (12 June 1915) & 1st Class  (2 December 1917)

 Clasp to the Iron Cross (1939) 2nd Class & 1st Class (May 1940)
 German Cross in Gold on 14 March 1943 as Generalleutnant and commander of the 7. Panzer-Division
 Knight's Cross of the Iron Cross with Oak Leaves
Knight's Cross on 15 July 1941 as Generalmajor and commander of the 7. Panzer-Division
278th Oak Leaves 22 August 1943 on 22 August 1943 as Generalmajor and commander of 7. Panzer-Division

References
Citations

Bibliography

 
 
 

1891 births
1979 deaths
Generals of Panzer Troops
Barons of Germany
German Army personnel of World War I
Condor Legion personnel
Recipients of the clasp to the Iron Cross, 1st class
German military personnel of the Spanish Civil War
Recipients of the Gold German Cross
Recipients of the Knight's Cross of the Iron Cross with Oak Leaves
Recipients of the Military Medal (Spain)
German prisoners of war in World War II held by the Soviet Union
People from the Rhine Province
Prussian Army personnel
Reichswehr personnel
Military personnel from Aachen